Sthenocranion severini is a species of beetle in the family Carabidae, the only species in the genus Sthenocranion.

References

Pterostichinae